Lionel Rivera (born 1956) is an American politician who served as the mayor of Colorado Springs, Colorado from 2003 to 2011. Elected in April 2003 and re-elected in 2007 on a mail ballot only election, he is the first Hispanic Mayor in the city's history.

Early life and education 
Born in El Paso, Texas, Rivera earned a Bachelor's Degree in Microbiology from Texas Tech University and a Master of Business Administration from Jacksonville State University.

Career 
Rivera came to Colorado Springs in 1984 as an Army Captain stationed at Fort Carson. He has served on many community boards including being a founder and past president of the Colorado Springs Hispanic Chamber of Commerce, serving on the Colorado Springs Greater Chamber of Commerce Board and United Way Board of Trustees and Executive Committee and a co-chair of The Springs Community Action Plan. Rivera was first elected to an at large City Council seat in April 1997 and re-elected again in April 1999. In April 2001, he was elected by his City Council colleagues to serve as Vice Mayor for a two-year term.

He ran for U.S. Congress in Colorado's 5th congressional district in the United States House of Representatives but lost in the Republican primary to Doug Lamborn, on August 8, 2006.

He was succeeded by Colorado Springs mayor Steve Bach on May 17, 2011. He did not run for re-election due to term limits.

References

Colorado Springs government website — Official biography
Official campaign site

1956 births
Living people
People from El Paso, Texas
Texas Tech University alumni
Mayors of Colorado Springs, Colorado
Hispanic and Latino American mayors
Colorado Springs City Council members
United States Army officers
Colorado Republicans
Military personnel from Texas
Latino conservatism in the United States